Brunhilde "Bruni" Baßler (Bassler), married surname: Skotnicky, is a former pair skater who represented West Germany. In 1970, she and her skating partner, Eberhard Rausch, won gold at the Kennedy Memorial Winter Games and West German Championships. The pair finished in the top ten at four ISU Championships — 1969 Worlds in Colorado Springs, Colorado, United States; 1970 Europeans in Leningrad, Soviet Union; 1970 Worlds in Ljubljana, Yugoslavia; and 1971 Europeans in Zürich, Switzerland. Their partnership ended in 1971.

Baßler also competed in roller skating. During her competitive career, she was a member of Mannheimer ERC e.V. After retiring from competition, she became a skating coach based in Oberstdorf. She married Slovak ice dancer Martin Skotnický.

Competitive highlights 
With Eberhard Rausch

References 

German female pair skaters
German roller skaters
Living people
Sportspeople from Mannheim
Year of birth missing (living people)